Dav Bakdong Meas is a 1972 Khmer film directed by So Min Chiv. The film stars Vann Vannak and Vichara Dany.It  is the sequence to the 1971's Chaúng Dai Onpuk.

Cast 
Vann Vannak
Vichara Dany
Dara Chom Chann

Soundtrack

References 
 

Khmer-language films
Cambodian drama films
1972 films